Erik Waller may refer to:

 Erik Waller (collector) (1875–1955), Swedish surgeon and book collector
 Erik Waller (sailor) (1887–1958), Swedish sailor